Echinogurges is a genus of sea snails, marine gastropod molluscs in the family Eucyclidae.

Species
Species within the genus Echinogurges include:
 Echinogurges anoxius (Dall, 1927)
 Echinogurges clavatus (Watson, 1879)
 Echinogurges tuberculatus Quinn, 1991
 Echinogurges tubulatus (Dall, 1927)

References

External links
 Quinn J.F. Jr (1979). Biological results of the University of Miami deep-sea expeditions. 130. The systematics & zoogeography of the gastropod family Trochidae collected in the Straits of Florida & its approaches; Malacologia, 19(1): 1-62

 
Eucyclidae